Yvon is a surname. Notable people with the surname include:

 Adolphe Yvon (1817–1893), French painter
 Carlo Yvon (1798–1854), Italian composer, oboist, and English horn player
 Claude Yvon (1714–1791), French encyclopedist
 Dominique Yvon (born 1968), French ice dancer
 George Yvon (1887–1957), British diver